Kelim is an unincorporated community in Larimer County, in the U.S. state of Colorado.

History
A post office called Kelim was established in 1915, and remained in operation until 1925. The community was named after Lee J. Kelim, an early settler.

References

Unincorporated communities in Larimer County, Colorado
Unincorporated communities in Colorado